Vladimir Santos Farrell (born 31 May 1981) is a former footballer who played as a striker. Born in the Dominican Republic, he represented the Montserrat national team at international level.

Career
Born in the Dominican Republic, Farrell and his family emigrated to Montserrat when he was a child.

He made his international debut for Montserrat in 2000, coincidentally, against Dominican Republic. He played in "The Other Final", squandering his team's only chance.

In February 2009 he signed for Conference North side Hucknall Town from Sutton Town, who he had joined the previous September.

He had previously played for South Normanton Athletic, Shirebrook Town and Long Eaton United.

References

External links
 
 

1981 births
Living people
Sportspeople from San Pedro de Macorís
Dominican Republic emigrants to Montserrat
Naturalised citizens of the United Kingdom
Dominican Republic footballers
Montserratian footballers
South Normanton Athletic F.C. players
Shirebrook Town F.C. players
Long Eaton United F.C. players
Sutton Town A.F.C. players
Hucknall Town F.C. players
Montserrat international footballers
Dominican Republic expatriate footballers
Montserratian expatriate footballers
Expatriate footballers in England
Association football forwards